Mud Center is an unincorporated community on the west edge of Evansville in Perry Township, Vanderburgh County, in the U.S. state of Indiana. Mud Center is said to be part of the nearby community of Red Bank, even though it is a completely separate community. It is bordered on the east by Carpenter Creek and on the north by Broadway Avenue.

Geography

References

Communities of Southwestern Indiana
Unincorporated communities in Vanderburgh County, Indiana
Unincorporated communities in Indiana